Fire Island, New York is a  long barrier island far off the southern shore of Long Island, New York.

Fire Island may also refer to:

Places
 Fire Island (Aleutian Islands)
 Fire Island (Anchorage, Alaska)
 Green Island, Taiwan, known before 1949 as Fire Island or Bonfire Island
 Ognenny Ostrov (Russian for Fire Island), an island of Lake Novozero in Belozersky District, Vologda Oblast, Russia
 An island in the Isle Royale National Park, in Lake Superior

Music
 Fire Island (duo), an English house music duo
 "Fire Island", a 1992 song by the duo
 "Fire Island", a song by the Village People from their 1977 self-titled album
 "Fire Island", a song by Fountains of Wayne from their 2003 album Welcome Interstate Managers
 "Fire Island", a 1984 song by Scottish band Secession
 "Fire Island", a song by the Village People from their 1977 self-titled album
 "Fire Island, AK", a song by The Long Winters from their 2006 album Putting the Days to Bed

Other uses
 Fire Island (film), a 2022 American film by Andrew Ahn
 Fire Island (TV series), 2017 American reality TV series
 Fire Island (Pokémon), a location in Pokémon: The Movie 2000
 An island of the fictional Land of Ev in the Oz books of L. Frank Baum
 A hosta cultivar
 "Fire Island" (American Horror Story), an episode of the eleventh season of American Horror Story

See also
 
 Isla del Fuego, located in the Philippines
 Island Fire, a 2007 fire on Santa Catalina Island, California